Burzin Shah, also known by the Arabicized form of Barzan Jah, was an Iranian nobleman from the House of Karen. A descendant of Sukhra, he was the governor of Nishapur during the reign of the Sasanian king Yazdegerd III (r. 632–651).

Biography 
In 651-652, Abdullah ibn Aamir invaded Khorasan, and made a treaty with the kanarang of Tus, Kanadbak. In the treaty Kanadbak agreed to pay tribute to the Arabs while still remaining in control of his territories in Tus. In order to strengthen the weakened Karen family, and to reclaim lost Karenid territory, Burzin, along with another Karenid named Sawar Karin, made resistance to the Arabs and tried to reclaim territory from the Kanārangīyān family. However, Abdullah, with the aid of Kanadbak, invaded Nishapur and defeated the two rebels. Abdullah then rewarded Kanadbak by giving him control of Nishapur. It is not known if Burzin was killed during this event.

References

Sources 

7th-century births
7th-century Iranian people
House of Karen
Year of death missing
Governors of the Sasanian Empire